Huayuan station can refer to:
Huayuan station (Chengdu Metro), a metro station in Chengdu, China
Huayuan station (Tianjin Metro), a metro station in Tianjin, China